In mathematics (particularly multivariable calculus), a volume integral (∭) refers to an integral over a 3-dimensional domain; that is, it is a special case of multiple integrals. Volume integrals are especially important in physics for many applications, for example, to calculate flux densities.

In coordinates
It can also mean a triple integral within a region  of a function  and is usually written as:

A volume integral in cylindrical coordinates is

Example 

Integrating the equation  over a unit cube yields the following result:

So the volume of the unit cube is 1 as expected. This is rather trivial however, and a volume integral is far more powerful. For instance if we have a scalar density function on the unit cube then the volume integral will give the total mass of the cube. For example for density function:
 
the total mass of the cube is:

See also

Divergence theorem
Surface integral
Volume element

External links
 
 

Multivariable calculus